Santa Catalina is a village in the Soriano Department of western Uruguay.

Geography
The railroad track Montevideo - Mercedes passes through the town.

History
On 19 December 1940, the status of the populated nucleus here was elevated to "Pueblo" (village) by the Act of Ley Nº 9.985. Previously, it had been the head of the judicial section "Arroyo el Medio".

Population
In 2011 Santa Catalina had a population of 998.
 
Source: Instituto Nacional de Estadística de Uruguay

References

External links
INE map of Santa Catalina

Populated places in the Soriano Department